3-Monoacetylmorphine (3-MAM) or 3-acetylmorphine is a less active metabolite of heroin (diacetylmorphine), the other two being morphine and  more active 6-monoacetylmorphine (6-MAM).

Because of the acetyl-group in 3-position, 3-MAM has relatively weak affinity to μ-opioid receptors.

As 3-O-acetylmorphine-6-O-sulfate (C19H23NO7S), where 6-OH is changed to 6-O-SO3, it can act as  a potent, centrally acting morphine derivative and has important analgesic properties.

References 

Heroin
Opioid metabolites